Zspace may refer to:

 zSpace (company), a virtual reality hardware/software company
 Z Communications, a left-wing activist-oriented media group